Southwell is a surname. Notable people with the surname include:

Alec Southwell, Australian lawyer and judge
Alfredo Salazar Southwell (1913–1937), aviator
Anne Southwell (1574–1636), English poet
Charles Southwell (1814–1860), journalist
David Southwell (born 1971), author
Dayle Southwell (born 1993), professional footballer
Elizabeth Southwell (courtier) (died 1631), English courtier
Elizabeth Southwell (1674–1709), English aristocrat
Hugo Southwell (born 1980), rugby player
Owen J. T. Southwell (1892–1961), American architect
Paul Southwell (1913–1979), Premier of Dominica and Saint Kitts-Nevis
Richard V. Southwell (1888–1970), mathematician specializing in applied mechanics
Richard Southwell (disambiguation)
Robert Southwell (disambiguation)

English toponymic surnames